Haveh (also Romanized as Hoveh) is a village in Farsesh Rural District, in the Central District of Aligudarz County, Lorestan Province, Iran. At the 2006 census, its population was 16, in 6 families.

References 

Towns and villages in Aligudarz County